Saint-Laurent-sur-Othain (literally Saint-Laurent on Othain) is a commune in the Meuse department in Grand Est in north-eastern France.

Geography
The village lies in the middle of the commune, on the left bank of the Othain, which flows west-northwestward through the commune.

See also
Communes of the Meuse department

References

Saintlaurentsurothain